Peter John Otter Self (7 June 1919 – 29 March 1999) was an English journalist, academic, planning policy-maker and university teacher of planning.

Self was born in Brighton, to Audrey (Otter) and Henry Self, a civil servant. Self was educated at Lancing College and Balliol College, Oxford, where he read Philosophy, Politics and Economics. In the Second World War, he was a conscientious objector, working on a farm. In his academic career, he became Professor of Public Administration at the London School of Economics, where he was a prominent member and leader of its Greater London Group research centre.  He was also a prominent member of the Town and Country Planning Association. He then became Professor of Urban Research at the Australian National University. He died in Canberra on 29 March 1999.

He was the father of Jonathan Self and Will Self.

Bibliography
 Regionalism, 1949
 Whither Local Government?, 1950
 Cities in Flood: The Problems of Urban Growth, 1960
 The State and the Farmer, 1962 
 Metropolitan Planning: Planning System of Greater London, 1971 
 Planning the Urban Region: A Comparative Study of Policies and Organizations, 1982 
 New Towns: The British Experience, 1972
 Administrative Theories and Politics: An Enquiry into the Structure and Processes of Modern Government, 1972 
 Econocrats and the Policy Process: Politics and Philosophy of Cost-benefit Analysis, 1976  
 Administrative Theories and Politics: An Enquiry into the Structure and Processes of Modern Government, 1977 
 Political Theories of Modern Government - Its role and reform, Unwin Hyman, London, 1985 
 Government by the Market? The Politics of Public Choice, 1993 
 Rolling Back the Market, 1999

References

Further reading
SELF, Prof. Peter John Otter’, Who Was Who, A & C Black, an imprint of Bloomsbury Publishing plc, 1920–2014; online edn, Oxford University Press, 2014 ; online edn, April 2014 accessed 3 Sept 2014

External links
 Obituary ANU Reporter 

1919 births
1999 deaths
Academic staff of the Australian National University
English male journalists
Academics of the London School of Economics
People educated at Lancing College
Alumni of Balliol College, Oxford
British conscientious objectors
English male non-fiction writers
Peter